"Gan-Ga" is a song by Puerto Rican rapper Bryant Myers released on July 26, 2019. On November 15, 2019, a remix featuring Puerto Rican rapper Anuel AA was released on and peaked 11 on the Hot Latin Songs chart.

Remix
The official remix of the song is a collaboration with fellow Puerto Rican rapper Anuel AA. It is released on 15 November 2019 on Bryant Myers' Youtube channel.

A few days later other musicians like Farruko, Myke Towers, Jhayco and Miky Woodz  recorded their own parts of the song.

On 10 April 2020, Bryant Myers dropped Gan-Ga (Uptown Remix) featuring American rappers French Montana and Lil Tjay.

Controversy
On October 17, 2019, Anuel AA generated controversy by posting "Nunca flow Maluma, siempre Real G" on his social media, directed at Colombian singer Maluma.

Charts

Certifications

References

2019 singles
2019 songs
Anuel AA songs
Latin trap songs
Music controversies
Spanish-language songs
Songs written by Anuel AA
Songs written by French Montana
Songs written by Lil Tjay